Live in London 2011 is a live album by Miyavi released on May 2, 2011. It was recorded on March 19, 2011 at the HMV Forum in London as part of the 'What's My Name?' world tour. The double disc album initially went on sale at subsequent shows as a rough mix from Abbey Road Live Studios.

Track listing

References

2011 live albums
Miyavi albums